Treachery is a 2013 American thriller film written and directed by Travis Romero and starring Michael Biehn.

Premise
An estranged father and son are re-united at a wedding party. However, a storm traps them in a cabin, leading to worse things to come.

Cast
Michael Biehn as Henry
Jennifer Blanc Biehn as Becki 
Caitlin Keats as Vanessa
Chris Meyer as Evan
Matthew Ziff as Nathan
Sarah Butler as Cecilia
Richard Gunn as Robert
Lorraine Ziff as Carla Greene Esq.

Development
Most of the cast of the film were announced on May 3, 2012.

Filming began in June 2012 and the first set photo was released on June 14, 2012. Another set photo was revealed by Fangoria. The film is being developed by the company BlancBiehn Productions. The film was partly funded by a campaign on Kickstarter.

Filming occurred mostly in Los Angeles.

The film's producers are Paul Foley, Ryan Azevedo, Denny Kirkwood, Jason Sallee, Kate Rees Davies, Christopher C. Murphy and Andreas Ziebart.

Critical response
The film has been reviewed by several critics. One of the movie's first reviewers, a writer for allenbe.net, states, "It’s a breath of fresh air in a dark, sadistic and treacherous kind of way".

Release
Origin Releasing set the release of the film for the 4th quarter of 2015.

References

External links

First Word on Michael Biehn's Treachery at Dread Central

2013 films
Kickstarter-funded films
American thriller films
2013 thriller films
Crowdfunded films
2010s English-language films
2010s American films